Kaire Vilgats (born 11 January 1976) is an Estonian vocalist and actress, known for numerous roles in stage musicals. Over the years, she has repeatedly participated in the Eurovision Song Contest as a backing vocalist for Estonian entries.

Early life 
Kaire Vilgats was born and spent her childhood in Pärnu, a resort town in the south-west of Estonia, where she also went to school. She learnt the accordion in a music school before taking classes in singing.

Career 
Vilgats has later been trained in pop-jazz singing at the Georg Ots Music School in Tallinn, with Silvi Vrait as her vocal coach.

In 1999, Vilgats was awarded third place in the Kaks takti ette contest for young singers, organized by Estonian Television. The winner of that season was an Estonian rock star, Tanel Padar, with Eda-Ines Etti in second position. The same year, she was cast in the company of the Estonian production of the musical La Cage aux Folles which was her theatre début. A series of supporting roles in musicals were to follow.

Kaire Vilgats has been the musical director of the Estonian Puppet Theatre in Tallinn, where she composed music for children's musicals and plays, like, The Little Witch by Otfried Preußler.

In 2006, she was nominated for an Estonian theatre prize for the supporting role of Amps in the musical  but did not win.

Roles 
 2000: Tanz der Vampire (Magda)
 2000: Little Shop of Horrors (Crystal)
 2000: Zorba (Storyteller)
 2001:  No, No, Nanette (Betty from Boston)
 2001: Les Misérables (Mme Thenardier, understudy)
 2002: Miss Saigon (Gigi)
 2003: Fiddler on the Roof (Golde)
 2004: Crazy for You (Irene Roth)
 2006: Fame (Esther Sherman)
 2006:  (Amps)
 2006: Lumekuninganna (Snow Queen) (Grandmother/Snow Queen)
 2007: Phantom (Carlotta)
 2008: Anything Goes (Reno Sweeney)
 2008: Buratino senitundmatud seiklused ("Buratino`s Yet Unknown Adventures") (Malviina)
 2011: Libahunt ("The Warewolf") (Grandmother)
 2011: The Beauty and the Beast (Teapot)
 2011: Karlsson katuselt ("Karlsson on the Roof") (Hildur Sokk), drama
 2012: Seljatas sada meest ("Overcame a Hundred Men") (Maria Loorberg), drama
 2013: Shrek (Dragon)
 2014: Koerhaldjas Mia (Dog-Fairy Mia) (Christmas Mom)
 2015: Billy Elliiot (Mrs Wilkinson)
 2015: Karlsson katuselt ("Karlsson on the Roof"), (Hildur Sokk) 
 2016: Mamma Mia (Rosie Mulligan / Tanya Chesham-Leigh) 
 2017: Les Misérables (Mme Thenardier)

As a chorist, Vilgats has appeared in Evita, La Cage aux Folles, Georg and Mort. She is also a voice actress and vocal coach.

 Other credits 
Kaire Vilgats is a backing vocalist for different Estonian pop acts, such as Anne Veski, Ivo Linna or Maarja.

With 7 appearances, she is holding the record of biggest number of participations in the Eurovision Song Contest for Estonia. In 2000 and 2002, she sang backing vocals for the Estonian and Maltese songs, and did the same for Estonia at 2014, 2016, 2017 and 2019 contests. The 2020 contest in Rotterdam she was to attend as a backing singer got cancelled due to the pandemic spread of coronavirus.

Vilgats provided her vocals for the album Family. We are Family, released in 2003 as a cooperative effort of several popular vocalists, such as Nele-Liis Vaiksoo and Lauri Pihlap. She has also performed with the Estonian Police Orchestra and a number of other orchestras and groups.

Kaire Vilgats has been open about her weight problems and has therefore given patronage to sporting events, like Tartu Maraton in which she successfully participates. She has co-hosted and participated in TV-shows, Your Face Sounds Familiar among many.

In 2021, she had a small role in the Ergo Kuld directed comedy film Jahihooaeg. In 2023, she appeared as Sohvia in the Kuld directed feature film comedy Suvitajad''.

Personal life 
Vilgats is a mother of three children, two sons and a daughter. She is divorced from a music producer Johannes Lõhmus.

Vilgats' mother is Ester Vilgats, a news journalist for Estonian Public Broadcasting.

References

External links

1976 births
Living people
21st-century Estonian women singers
Estonian stage actresses
Estonian musical theatre actresses
Eurovision Song Contest entrants for Estonia
Estonian pop singers
People from Pärnu
21st-century Estonian actresses
Eesti Laul contestants
Tallinn Georg Ots Music School alumni